Vasas Sport Club is a professional football club based in Budapest, Hungary.

Matches

Record by country
Correct as of 30 June 2017

 P – Played; W – Won; D – Drawn; L – Lost

Club record
As of 1 May 2018.
Biggest win: 30/09/1981, Vasas 8-0  Enosis Neon Paralimni, Budapest
Biggest defeat: 02/04/1958,  Real Madrid 4-0 Vasas, Madrid
Appearances in UEFA Champions League:  6
Appearances in UEFA Cup Winners' Cup:  4
Appearances in UEFA Europa League:  5
Appearances in UEFA Intertoto Cup:  4
Player with most UEFA appearances: 22  Pál Berendi
Top scorers in UEFA club competitions: 8  Lajos Csordás,  János Farkas

References

External links

Vasas SC
Hungarian football clubs in international competitions